Progress M-30 was a Russian unmanned Progress cargo spacecraft, which was launched in December 1995 to resupply the Mir space station.

Launch
Progress M-30 launched on 8 December 1995 from the Baikonur Cosmodrome in Kazakhstan. It used a Soyuz-U rocket.

Docking
Progress M-30 docked with the aft port of the Kvant-1 module of Mir on 20 December 1995 at 16:10:15 UTC, and was undocked on 22 February 1996 at 07:24:00 UTC.

Decay
It remained in orbit until 22 February 1996, when it was deorbited. The deorbit burn occurred at 11:02:36 UTC.

See also

 1995 in spaceflight
 List of Progress missions
 List of uncrewed spaceflights to Mir

References

Progress (spacecraft) missions
1995 in Kazakhstan
Spacecraft launched in 1995
Spacecraft which reentered in 1996
Spacecraft launched by Soyuz-U rockets